Pir Mam Rashan or Pir Mehmed Reshan was a 12th-century Yazidi saint. The Mam Rashan Shrine on Mount Sinjar was built in honor of him.
As a patron saint of agriculture, he is considered to be the protector of harvests and bringer of rain. His feast is celebrated in spring. There is a shrine dedicated to him at Lalish. Also, a shrine that is claimed as his tomb is situated behind Mount Maqlub near Bardarash, Iraq. During times of drought, special ceremonies are held at sites dedicated to him to pray for rain and blessing of cultivated land.

See also
List of Yazidi holy figures
List of Yazidi holy places

References

12th-century births
12th-century deaths
Yazidi holy figures
12th-century Kurdish people